Rostovsky District is an administrative and municipal district (raion), one of the seventeen in Yaroslavl Oblast, Russia. It is located in the southeast of the oblast. Its administrative center is the town of Rostov (which is not administratively a part of the district). As of the 2010 Census, the total population of the district was 34,062.

Administrative and municipal status
Within the framework of administrative divisions, Rostovsky District is one of the seventeen in the oblast. The town of Rostov serves as its administrative center, despite being incorporated separately as a town of oblast significance—an administrative unit with the status equal to that of the districts.

As a municipal division, the district is incorporated as Rostovsky Municipal District, with the town of oblast significance of Rostov being incorporated within it as Rostov Urban Settlement.

References

Notes

Sources

Districts of Yaroslavl Oblast
 
